The 2009 Karachi floods in Pakistan's financial centre, Karachi, have killed at least 26 people. The death toll is expected to rise, and more than 150 people have been injured in a series of related incidents. The floods are the result of the heaviest rains in the region in thirty years.

Hundreds of homes were also damaged. Those killed either drowned, were electrocuted or died under collapsing roofs. A bit of a building's sixth floor collapsed in Ramswami—debris dropping onto a nearby house, killing four members of a family and injuring 10. Several others were injured as a result of a roof collapse in the Orangi area and two people died in a similar incident. Eleven people were injured after a house wall fell through in Manghopir. Seven people were electrocuted in separate sections of Karachi. One resident reported the death of his neighbor's son to Reuters, saying he drowned in a drain and his body was pulled out. Knee-deep water stranded several thousand people in their homes for several hours. Commercial markets were waterlogged and several hundred vehicles were trapped on the city's roads.

Most of Karachi had no electricity on the night of 18 July 2009. Relief efforts are ongoing as water is removed from residential areas.

According to Qamar-uz-Zaman Chaudhry, the country's chief meteorologist, Pakistan's commercial hub received 14.7 cm (6 in) of rain between the evening of 17 July and the morning of 19 July. However, the rains began around two weeks later than usual and thus are expected to lead to a 30% reduction in rainfall for the 2009 season.

However it only dumped  rain and the system dissipated quickly on 26 July. Then on August 30 and 31 sudden heavy rains started to lash the city which dumped  rain, Thus again Karachiites were forced to spend the night sleepless due to power breakdown and thousands were forced to end their fasting in traffic jams, as it was the holy month of Ramadan.

See also

 Climate of Karachi
 Climate of Pakistan
 2009 India floods
 2017 Karachi floods

References

External links 
 35 more killed in Karachi rain-related incidents - The News
 Floods in Karachi - The City-sized Waterpark - artsyHANDS

Karachi Floods, 2009
Floods in Pakistan
Karachi Floods, 2009
2000s in Karachi
History of Sindh (1947–present)